1291 Phryne, provisional designation , is an Eoan asteroid from the outer regions of the asteroid belt, approximately 27 kilometers in diameter. It was discovered on 15 September 1933, by Belgian astronomer Eugène Delporte at the Royal Observatory of Belgium in Uccle. The asteroid was named after the ancient Greek courtesan Phryne.

Orbit and classification 

Phryne is a member the Eos family, the largest asteroid family in the outer main belt consisting of nearly 10,000 asteroids. It orbits the Sun at a distance of 2.7–3.3 AU once every 5 years and 3 months (1,911 days). Its orbit has an eccentricity of 0.09 and an inclination of 9° with respect to the ecliptic.

Physical characteristics 

Phryne is an assumed stony S-type asteroid, while the Eon family's overall spectral type is that of a K-type.

Rotation period 

In May 1984, a rotational lightcurve of Phryne was obtained by astronomer Richard Binzel. Lightcurve analysis gave a well-defined rotation period of 5.55 hours with a brightness variation of 0.86 magnitude. In August 2006, from photometric observations by French amateur astronomer Pierre Antonini gave a period of 5.58410 hours and an amplitude of 0.38 magnitude

Poles 

In 2011, a modeled lightcurve using data from the Uppsala Asteroid Photometric Catalogue (UAPC) and other sources gave a period 5.58414 hours, as well as two spin axis of (106.0°, 35.0°) and (277.0°, 59.0°) in ecliptic coordinates (λ, β). In 2017, a new study of the same international collaboration about the rotational states of Eoan asteroids gave a revised shape model with a period of 5.584139 hours and two spin axis of (109.0°, 33.0°) and (281.0°, 56.0°).

Diameter and albedo 

According to the surveys carried out by the Infrared Astronomical Satellite IRAS, the Japanese Akari satellite and the NEOWISE mission of NASA's Wide-field Infrared Survey Explorer, Phryne measures between 24.954 and 31.13 kilometers in diameter and its surface has an albedo between 0.127 and 0.1818.

The Collaborative Asteroid Lightcurve Link derives an albedo of 0.1355 and a diameter of 26.52 kilometers based on an absolute magnitude of 10.67.

Naming 

This minor planet was named after Phryne, the beautiful ancient Greek courtesan (hetaira) of the 4th century B.C. Supposedly, she was the model for the statue Aphrodite of Knidos by ancient Greek sculptor Praxiteles (see asteroid ), who was also her lover. It was the first nude statue of a woman from ancient Greece. The official naming citation was mentioned in The Names of the Minor Planets by Paul Herget in 1955.

References

External links 
 Asteroid Lightcurve Database (LCDB), query form (info )
 Dictionary of Minor Planet Names, Google books
 Asteroids and comets rotation curves, CdR – Observatoire de Genève, Raoul Behrend
 Discovery Circumstances: Numbered Minor Planets (1)-(5000) – Minor Planet Center
 
 

001291
Discoveries by Eugène Joseph Delporte
Named minor planets
19330915